The 2023 Carlos Alcaraz tennis season officially began on 16 January 2023, with the start of the Australian Open in Melbourne. Alcaraz to return to action at Argentina Open following injury suffered prior to Australian Open.
During this season, Alcaraz:
 Clinched the world number 1 ranking for 21 weeks (as of 20 March 2023).

Yearly summary

Early hard court season

Australian Open

World No. 1 Carlos Alcaraz withdraws from Grand Slam tournament suffered a hamstring injury in his right leg while training.

Argentina Open

Top-seeded Carlos Alcaraz won his first title since his milestone US Open triumph by beating Cameron Norrie in straight sets at the Argentina Open.

Rio Open

All matches

This table chronicles all the matches of Carlos Alcaraz in 2023.

Singles matches

Exhibition matches

Singles

Schedule
Per Carlos Alcaraz, this is his current 2023 schedule (subject to change).

Singles schedule

Yearly records

Head-to-head matchups
Carlos Alcaraz has a  ATP match win–loss record in the 2023 season. Bold indicates player was ranked top 10 at the time of at least one meeting. The following list is ordered by number of wins:

  Dušan Lajović 2–0
  Félix Auger-Aliassime 1–0
  Mateus Alves 1–0
  Laslo Đere 1–0
  Jack Draper 1–0
  Fabio Fognini 1–0
  Tallon Griekspoor 1–0
  Nicolás Jarry 1–0
  Thanasi Kokkinakis 1–0
  Daniil Medvedev 1-0
  Bernabé Zapata Miralles 1–0
  Cameron Norrie 1–1

* Statistics correct .

Top 10 wins

Finals

Singles: 3 (2 title, 1 Runner-up)

Earnings
Bold font denotes tournament win

 Figures in United States dollars (USD) unless noted. 
source：2023 Singles Activity
source：2023 Doubles Activity

See also

 2023 ATP Tour
 2023 Rafael Nadal tennis season
 2023 Novak Djokovic tennis season
 2023 Daniil Medvedev tennis season

Notes

References

External links
 ATP tour profile

Carlos Alcaraz tennis seasons
Alcaraz
Alcaraz
2023 in Spanish sport